Gilberto Gramellini (17 November 1930 – 18 December 2013) was an Italian wrestler. Gramellini competed in the Greco-Roman wrestling bantamweight division at the 1960 Summer Olympics and finished in ninth place.

References

External links
 

1930 births
2013 deaths
Olympic wrestlers of Italy
Wrestlers at the 1960 Summer Olympics
Italian male sport wrestlers